The 1920 Iowa gubernatorial election was held on November 2, 1920. Republican nominee Nathan E. Kendall defeated Democratic nominee Clyde L. Herring with 58.66% of the vote.

General election

Candidates
Major party candidates
Nathan E. Kendall, Republican
Clyde L. Herring, Democratic 

Other candidates
George J. Peck, Socialist
Mathis Faber, Farmer–Labor 
J. Jay Hisel, Socialist Labor

Results

References

1920
Iowa
Gubernatorial